Galion, also spelled Gallion, is a mountain village in the south of Dominica, with a population of 134.

References

External links
Photos from Galion

Populated places in Dominica